Saint-Marc is a commune in Artibonite, Haiti.

Saint-Marc may also refer to:

Canada
Saint-Marc-des-Carrières, Quebec
Saint-Marc-de-Figuery, Quebec
Saint-Marc-du-Lac-Long, Quebec
Saint-Marc-sur-Richelieu, Quebec

Haiti
Saint-Marc Arrondissement, Artibonite

France
Saint-Marc-Jaumegarde, Bouches-du-Rhône
Saint-Marc, Cantal
Saint-Marc-sur-Seine, Côte-d'Or
Saint-Marc-à-Frongier, Creuse
Saint-Marc-à-Loubaud, Creuse
Saint-Marc-la-Lande, Deux-Sèvres
Saint-Marc-le-Blanc, Ille-et-Vilaine
Saint-Marc-sur-Couesnon, Ille-et-Vilaine
Saint-Marc-du-Cor, Loir-et-Cher
Saint-Marc-sur-Mer, Loire-Atlantique

See also
 Saint Mark (disambiguation)
 San Marco (disambiguation)